The Kolar leaf-nosed bat (Hipposideros hypophyllus), or leafletted leaf-nosed bat is a species of bat in the family Hipposideridae. It is endemic to India.  Its natural habitats are subtropical or tropical dry forests and caves. It is found in only one cave in India, and its population is less than 200 individuals.

Taxonomy
This species was described in 1994. The Hipposideros bats of South Asia are divided into closely related species groups. The Kolar leaf-nosed bat is placed in the "bicolor" species group, which also includes:

It is most closely related to Cantor's roundleaf bat and the fawn leaf-nosed bat; these three species form a clade in the genus Hipposideros.

Description
The fur on its back is variable in color, with some individuals' hairs tipped with grayish-brown, while others' hairs are tipped with rufous brown. Fur on the ventral surface is tipped in white or fulvous-white. Its nose-leaf has two supplementary leaflets that project from underneath the sides of the front nose-leaf.

Biology
It echolocates at 103–105.3kHz. During the day, it roosts in caves.
It has been documented sharing a roost site with several other species of bat, including Khajuria's leaf-nosed bat (Hipposideros durgadasi), fulvus roundleaf bat (Hipposideros fulvus), and Schneider's leaf-nosed bat (Hipposideros speoris). It accumulates fat in the winter months, suggesting that it may use torpor in colder months. Pregnant and lactating females have been observed late in the summer.

Range and habitat
It is known from only one cave in Hanumanahalli village in the Kolar district of the state of Karnataka in India. Its cave is described as an inaccessibly narrow opening in granite rocks. Previously, it was known from a nearby cave in Therahalli village, but it is absent from that cave as of 2014. It has not been encountered at elevations above . The habitat surrounding its single remaining cave consists of tropical dry shrubland.

Conservation
It is currently evaluated as critically endangered by the IUCN. The Kolar leaf-nosed bat is found in only one cave, and its population is less than 200 individuals. Its single cave is not on protected land, and the species itself is not protected by Indian law. Its habitat is under threat due to illegal granite mining. Granite miners have driven them out of at least two caves by setting fires; the fires make granite extraction easier. As reported in 2014, there was a temporary mining ban on the cave where this species is still found. Its critically endangered listing occurred in 2016; from 2004–2016, it was listed as endangered. From 2000–2004 it was listed as vulnerable, and from 1996–2000, it was listed as lower risk/near threatened.
There are petitions to have the bat protected under the Indian Wildlife Protection Act, as all bats in India are considered vermin with the exception of two species. However, as of 2017, these petitions have not been successful.

References

External links
An image of this species
Photos of a live male and several skulls
Photo of the cave where the only known colony roosts

Hipposideros
Mammals described in 1994
Bats of India
Taxonomy articles created by Polbot
Endemic fauna of India